This is a list of electoral results for the Division of Bean in Australian federal elections from the division's creation in 2019 until the present.

Members

Election results

Elections in the 2020s

2022

Elections in the 2010s

2019

References

 Australian Electoral Commission. Federal election results
 Carr, Adam. Psephos

Australian federal electoral results by division